Ujina is a Village located in Hodal-Nuh road in Nuh district in Haryana.
In Ancient time, Ujina was popular with the name of Ujina Lake as in rainy season it totally covered with water and people of nearby territories often came here for sightseeing. 
Ujina has 100% Hindu population. The People of Ujina actively participated in every war of Independence of India, whether it was the 1857 war; The First war of Independence or the Satyagrah by Mahatma Gandhi.

History
Ujina village was founded by Baba Baijal in nearly 1057 AD.

Geography
It has an average elevation of 194 metres (636 feet).
It is 83 km from the capital New Delhi. It is located in the far south west area of Haryana.

Climate
Climate in Ujina is Extreme.
Lowest Temperature: 3-5 degrees
Highest Temperature: 44-45 degrees

Demographics
 India census,
In Ujina village population of children with age 0-6 is 1418 which makes up 16.89 % of total population of village. Average Sex Ratio of Ujina village is 897 which is higher than Haryana state average of 879. Child Sex Ratio for the Ujina as per census is 878, higher than Haryana average of 834. 

Ujina village has lower literacy rate compared to Haryana. In 2011, literacy rate of Ujina village was  74.77 % compared to 75.55 % of Haryana. In Ujina Male literacy stands at 84.10 % while female literacy rate was 64.41 %. 

As per constitution of India and Panchyati Raaj Act, Ujina village is administrated by Sarpanch (Head of Village) who is elected representative of village.

Transportation
Ujina is situated on the Nuh Hodal highway. A frequent bus service is provided by Haryana Roadways. Nearest airport is IGI airport, New Delhi. Nearest railway station is Palwal (34 km) and Gurgaon (58 km).

Educational institutions

Schools
 Kalyan Senior Secondary School
 Aditya Army Public School
 Adarsh International School
 Government Girls Senior Secondary School
 Government Boys School
 Geeta Vidya Mandir
 Blue Bird Public School
 S.V.N Coaching and Computer Center

Nearby colleges 
 Government College for women, Salaheri, Nuh
 Yasin Mev Degree College, Nuh
 Mewat Engineering College, Palla, Nuh (Haryana)
 Government College, Nagina
 Modish Polytechnic, Punhana
 Shanti Sagar Jain Girls College, Ferozepur Jhirka
 Government Polytechnic, Uttawar
 Industrial Training Institute, Ujina
 Industrial Training Institute, Nagina
 Industrial Training Institute, Ferozepur Jhirka
 Industrial Training Institute, Nuh
 S.D.Mewat Institute of Technology and Management, Raoli, Ferozepur Jhirka
 Shaheed Hasan Khan Mewati Government Medical college, Nalhar, Nuh

Banking facilities
 State Bank Of India
 Union Bank
 Sarv Haryana Gramin Bank (Formerly Gurgaon Gramin Bank)
 Gurgaon Central Co-operative Bank

Nearby cities and towns
 Nuh
 Sohna
 Taoru
 Palwal
 Pinangwan
 Gurgaon
 F.P. Jhirka
 Faridabad
 Delhi
 Hodal
 Narnaul
 Hathin
 SmartPur(TAIN)

References

Cities and towns in Nuh district
Haryana